Socioeconomics (also known as social economics) is the social science that studies how economic activity affects and is shaped by social processes. In general it analyzes how modern societies progress, stagnate, or regress because of their local or regional economy, or the global economy.

Overview

“Socioeconomics” is sometimes used as an umbrella term for various areas of inquiry. The term “social economics” may refer broadly to the "use of economics in the study of society". More narrowly, contemporary practice considers behavioral interactions of individuals and groups through social capital and social "markets" (not excluding, for example, sorting by marriage) and the formation of social norms. In the relation of economics to social values.

A distinct supplemental usage describes social economics as "a discipline studying the reciprocal relationship between economic science on the one hand and social philosophy, ethics, and human dignity on the other" toward social reconstruction and improvement or as also emphasizing multidisciplinary methods from such fields as sociology, history, and political science. In criticizing mainstream economics for its alleged faulty philosophical premises (for example the pursuit of self-interest) and neglect of dysfunctional economic relationships, such advocates tend to classify social economics as heterodox.

Socioeconomic factors of environmental change 
The socioeconomic system at the regional level refers to the way social and economic factors influence one another in local communities and households. These systems have a significant impact on the environment through deforestation, pollution, natural disasters, and energy production and use. Through telecoupled systems, these interactions can lead to global impact. Local economies, food insecurity, and environmental hazards are all negative effects that are a direct outcome of socioeconomic systems.

Deforestation 
 
 Deforestation is a major cause of environmental change. Deforestation can be attributed to population growth, change in household dynamics, and resource management. Forests are traditionally owned by the state and control resource management which means their government is responsible for the development of forested land. Between 1970 and 2011, tree coverage decreased by 20.6%. The decrease can be attributed to community development and increased use of resources. The issue of deforestation is contributing to climate change because the wood is frequently burned and used as timber fuel which emits  into the atmosphere. Deforestation is also happening due to population growth and the expansion of farmland which creates feedback loops. When forests are cut down to begin agriculture practices, soil degradation often takes place and leads to further issues like declining crop yields, which can contribute to food insecurity and contraction in the economy.
 Due to deforestation, animals often lose their habitats and vegetation is significantly decreased. Habitat loss is common when deforestation happens because not only are the trees being cut down, but the land trees previously inhabited suffer extreme soil erosion due to lack of protection from the tree coverage. Animals' struggle to survive is further hindered due to high temperatures in places where tree coverage is lost. Local community economies are affected by this because they depend on these resources to drive their local markets and feed their families. Modern medicine is also affected by deforestation because several medicines are derived from plants found in these areas. Loss of these resources means a loss of income to local communities who depend on these natural resources for profit. This can have a global effect by creating shortages of some medicines worldwide.

Pollution 
 
 Ocean pollution has massively affected small fishing communities around the world. When the ocean water gets polluted, it has a range of effects on ocean life. Fish absorb mercury from coal mining and fossil fuel burning which makes them toxic to eat. Food insecurity is a socioeconomic impact of toxic marine life because small coastal communities depend on fishing to drive their local markets.  Big companies produce this pollution as a spillover system, which affects the fish, which then affects the surrounding communities.

Natural disasters 
 
 Natural disasters are becoming more severe as the environment is shifting. In the Western hemisphere, landslides are becoming more prevalent and severe. As communities continue to expand and develop, landscapes are disrupted by human interactions and unstable hillside areas begin to crumple under these pressures. These effects can be responsible for habitat loss for animals, home loss for humans, and complete destruction of industrial establishments. This can affect local economies just as any other natural disaster because it disrupts the entire flow of communities. They can be divided into private and public, for example, a highway being demolished by a landslide would be considered a public cost. A local farm that lost all of its crops due to a landslide would be considered a private cost. Urbanization and deforestation are primarily responsible for the increasing number of landslides in small communities.

Households 
 
 Another socioeconomic factor is the change in the household family. The nuclear family is traditionally two parents and their children living under the same roof. In the past, households frequently inhibited extended family members such as grandparents. With the shift in the number of people under one roof, there has been an increase in direct energy consumption. Fewer people per household means more households. People are shifting towards single-person households as our societal norms evolve. More households mean more energy being used to do things like heat the house, power more TVs, and use more lights. It also means more geographical land space being taken up by people which can lead to further urbanization of rural communities. This has been a shift in communities across the globe.

Conclusion  
 Deforestation, natural disasters, pollution, and energy consumption explicitly exhibit how human and natural systems are integrated systems. They are influenced by government policies and contextual factors which often have a more negative impact on the environment. Human interactions with the environment create a domino effect. These socioeconomic systems are all interconnected and produce effects from the local level, all the way up to the global level.

See also
 Socioeconomic status
 Social mobility
 Behavioral Strategy
 Economic sociology
 Political economy

Notes

References
 Gustav Cassel, [1931] 1932. The Theory of Social Economy. Reprinted 1967, Augustus M. Kelley. From the Mises Institute, select among sections (press +).
 Hellmich, Simon N. (2015) What is Socioeconomics? An Overview of Theories, Methods, and Themes in the Field, Forum for Social Economics 44 (1), 1-23.
 Pokrovskii, Vladimir N. (2011) Econodynamics. The Theory of Social Production, Springer, Berlin.
 Max Weber, 1922. Economy and Society, 2 v. Description and scroll to chapter-preview links.
 Friedrich von Wieser, [1924] 1928. Social Economics''. Foreword by Wesley C. Mitchell. Reprint 2003, Routledge. Scroll to chapter-preview links links.

External links

 Association for Social Economics
 The Society for the Advancement of Socio-Economics
 Economy and Society
 Journal of Socio-Economics
 Review of Social Economy
 Socio-Economic Review

 
Economic sociology
Schools of economic thought